Viny Pierrot Marcel Okouo (born April 10, 1997) is a Congolese professional basketball player for Fuenlabrada of the Liga ACB.

Professional career 
A native of the Republic of the Congo, Okouo started playing basketball when he was 15 years old and left home only shortly after to join the youth set-up of Unicaja Málaga in Spain. Okouo had been recommended by his fellow countryman Romaric Belemene. The Unicaja coaches had only seen some footage of Okouo practicing and were intrigued by his physical gifts, while his skills were underdeveloped. At Unicaja, he learned to play the game and improved vastly.

Between 2014 and 2016, he spent time on loan at Instituto de Fertilidad Clínicas Rincón of the LEB Plata, the third tier of Spanish basketball, while also seeing action for Unicaja’s development team in the EBA. Okouo made his ACB debut for Malaga during the 2015-16 campaign and saw his first minutes in the EuroCup the following season. In the 2016–17 season, Okouo won the EuroCup with Unicaja after beating Valencia Basket in the Finals.

On August 27, 2019, he signed with Nevėžis Kėdainiai of the Lithuanian Basketball League. 

Okouo entered into the NBA Draft as early as 2017, but was recorded as an early 2018 draft entry. His name was entered into the 2019 NBA Draft in which he was not selected.

On August 12, 2020, he has signed with Gipuzkoa Basket of the Spanish Liga ACB..

On July 12, 2021, he has signed with Monbus Obradoiro of the Spanish Liga ACB.

On August 13, 2022, he has signed with Fuenlabrada of the Liga ACB.

References

External links
 Viny Okouo at draftexpress.com
 Viny Okouo at eurobasket.com
 Viny Okouo at euroleague.net

1997 births
Living people
Baloncesto Fuenlabrada players
Baloncesto Málaga players
BC Nevėžis players
CB Axarquía players
Centers (basketball)
Expatriate basketball people in Spain
Gipuzkoa Basket players
Liga ACB players
Obradoiro CAB players
Republic of the Congo men's basketball players
Sportspeople from Brazzaville